Ernsta cordata is a species of sea sponge in the family Clathrinidae found in South Africa. The name means "heart-shaped" in Latin.

References

Clathrina
Sponges described in 1872
Fauna of South Africa
Taxa named by Ernst Haeckel